Nuestra Belleza Latina 2008 was the second season of Nuestra Belleza Latina, which premiered in February 2008 on Univision. Auditions were once again held in five major U.S. cities (Los Angeles; Houston; Miami; Chicago; and New York City) and in San Juan, Puerto Rico. During the audition process, 75 young women were given passes to the semifinals in Miami, Florida. The elimination process was quick, with 15 women leaving the first week, 40 in the second week, and finally, on March 28, 2008, eight women were eliminated leaving the 12 finalists who moved into a Miami mansion, where they lived for the rest of the competition.

Each week, viewers had the chance to vote for their favorite finalists. The three contestants with the fewest votes each week were in danger of being eliminated, with two being saved, one by her fellow finalists and the other by the judges. Melissa Marty, who represented Puerto Rico, won the competition, while Emeraude Toubia, who represented Mexico and Lebanon, placed second.

Changes
There were some major changes to the series in the second season; two of the judging panel, Carlos Calderon and Alicia Machado, left the show. Their replacements were beauty queen/model Lupita Jones and actor/model Julián Gil. Osmel Sousa maintained the role of head judge, and was tougher when he chose the girls throughout auditions.

Alejandra Espinoza became a correspondent for the series, interviewing the contestants backstage. The show was moved from Tuesdays to Fridays, airing at 10pm/9c.

Judges
 Osmel Sousa 
 Lupita Jones 
 Julián Gil

Elimination chart

Countries represented

 Eliminated
 First Place
 CPW: Countries Previously Won
 : Countries Previously Won

Contestants

Episodes

Episode 1: "Castings LA, Miami & Houston"
 Original Air Date: February 29, 2008
The best of the auditions held in Los Angeles, Miami and Houston.

The Guest Judges:

The following contestants were chosen:

Episode 2: "Castings NY, Chicago and Puerto Rico"
 Original Air Date: March 7, 2008
The best of the auditions held in New York, Chicago and Puerto Rico.

The Guest Judges:

The following contestants were chosen:

Episode 3: "Second Round in Miami"
 Original Air Date: March 14, 2008
The 75 selected girls go to Miami. They receive classes and hit the runway for the first time. The judges eliminate 15 of them.

Episode 4: "Weather Prompter"
 Original Air Date: March 21, 2008
The third round of eliminations. The 60 remaining girls face a new challenge: they have to be the "weather girl". Just 20 of them make the cut.

Episode 5: "Talent Showcase"
 Original Air Date: March 28, 2008
All the selected girls go to Miami. The judges evaluate them on stage and pick 20 semifinalists that have a talent to show onstage; but only the 12 of them named as finalists have the chance to perform in front of a live audience. The television audience gets to vote for the first time.

The Final 12:

Episode 6: "Extreme Runway"
 Original Air Date: April 4, 2008
The 12 finalists move to the "Mansion of the Beauty", where they start their physical training. They also have to face their first challenge: walk through a 10-inch-wide runway, wearing a tight dress, over a pool. At the end of the show, Jannete Manzanares is eliminated.

Episode 7: "Mr. Frog's Soap Opera"
 Original Air Date: April 11, 2008
The 11 remaining girls have to face the challenge of the week: after receiving an acting class from a soap opera star, they play a princess role in a fairy tale scene, where towards the end they must kiss a frog. At the end of the show, Leana Astorga is eliminated.

Episode 8: "Sabado Gigante Model"
 Original Air Date: April 18, 2008
The 10 remaining girls visit the studio of one of the longest running variety shows on television, Sabado Gigante. Their challenge is to act as models, saying the lines of an imaginary cereal's ad. At the end of the show, Dayanira Varela is eliminated.

Episode 9: "Underwater Photoshoot"
 Original Air Date: April 25, 2008
The 9 remaining finalists face the challenge of the week: doing an underwater photoshoot with stars' photographer Raul Higuera, in the house pool, holding their breath. The winner gets to meet Colombian singer Juanes at one of his concerts. At the end of the show, Aideliz Hidalgo is eliminated.

Episode 10: "Shampoo Audition"
 Original Air Date: May 2, 2008
The 8 remaining finalists receive a visit from singer-songwriter Jeremias at the house. The challenge of the week is an audition for a shampoo TV ad in front of real clients. Genesis Seguias, the winner, receives $10,000 in cash but, at the end of the show, she is eliminated based on the audience votes.

Episode 11: "Memory Game"
 Original Air Date: May 9, 2008
The 7 remaining girls go to a department store where they take a look at a mannequin for 10 seconds and have to mimic its clothes in less than 10 minutes. Later, live on the show, they have to model their outfits with style. Melissa Marty is the winner of the $10,000 cash prize. At the end of the show, Natalia Rivera is eliminated.

Episode 12: "The Big Finale 2008"
 Original Air Date: May 16, 2008
The results show. For the second year, the people have voted for their favorite. The 6 remaining contestants receive a final evaluation by the judges before they get to know their position. At the end of the show, Melissa Marty is crowned "Nuestra Belleza Latina 2008".

Episode 13: "El Destape 2008"
 Original Air Date: May 25, 2008
The best of this year's series. Deleted and extended scenes, backstage cameras, behind the scenes footage, interviews with the six finalists, the judges and the coaches.

Orden de llamados

 The contestant won the challenge of the week
 The contestant was eliminated
 The contestant won the challenge of the week, but was eliminated
 The contestant became the runner-up
 The contestant won the competition

Contestants notes
  Melissa Marty competed in Miss Puerto Rico Universe 2008 where she landed a position in the Top 13.
  Aideliz Hidalgo competed in Miss Universe Puerto Rico 2010, where she placed as 2nd Runner-up. She former Miss Puerto Rico International 2010 and semifinalist in Miss International 2010.
  Natalia Rivera competed in Miss Puerto Rico Teen 2006, where she won the title.
  Dayanira Varela competed in Nuestra Belleza México 2006 representing Zacatecas.
  Zoila Ceballos competed in Protagonistas First Season but was voted off in top 36.

External links
 Nuestra Belleza Latina, Univision.com 
 
 

Univision original programming
Nuestra Belleza Latina